Johor Darul Ta'zim II F.C. plays the 2021 season in the Malaysia Premier League.

Season overview
On 4 April 2021, the club won over Projek FAM-MSN 5-0 in a away league match.

On 7 April 2021, the club won 1-0 over PDRM in league match.

On 12 April 2021, the club draw 0-0 against Selangor II.

On 20 July 2021, the club won 2-0 over Sabah in a friendly match at Tan Sri Dato Hj Hassan Yunos Stadium.

On 4 August 2021, Johor Darul Ta'zim II beat Perak II 2-0 during Malaysia Premier League campaign.

On 7 August 2021, the club won 5-1 over Projek FAM-MSN.

Competitions

Malaysia Premier League

League table

Match results

Squad statistics

|-
!colspan="14"|Players away from the club on loan:

|}

Clean sheets

References

2021
JDT II